Eleocharis sphacelata, commonly known as tall spikerush, is a sedge of the family Cyperaceae that is native to Australia and New Zealand.

It blooms between February and October producing white flowers.

It is found in and around lagoons and in and swampy areas in coastal parts of the Kimberley, South West, Great Southern and Goldfields-Esperance regions of Western Australia where it grows in black muddy soils.

References

Plants described in 1810
Flora of Western Australia
sphacelata
Taxa named by Robert Brown (botanist, born 1773)